Otto Benndorf (13 September 1838 – 2 January 1907) was a German-Austrian archaeologist who was a native of Greiz, Principality of Reuss-Greiz. He was the father of physicist Hans Benndorf (1870–1953).

He studied under Friedrich Gottlieb Welcker (1784–1868), Otto Jahn (1813–1869) and Friedrich Ritschl (1806–1876) at the University of Bonn. Later, he worked as an instructor at Schulpforta, where one of his students was Friedrich Nietzsche. From 1864 to 1868 he was a member of a scientific expedition that toured Italy (Rome), Sicily, Greece and Asia Minor. In 1868 he obtained his habilitation at the University of Göttingen under the guidance of Friedrich Wieseler (1811–1892).

In 1869 he became an associate professor of archaeology at the University of Zurich, relocating to University of Munich in 1871 and to Prague the following year. With Alexander Conze (1831–1914), he took part in the second Austrian archaeological expedition to Samothrace (1875). Two years later, he succeeded Conze as chair of archaeology at the University of Vienna. Among his students at Vienna were Michael Rostovtzeff (1870–1952), Emil Szántó (1857–1904), Julius von Schlosser (1866–1938) and Franz Studniczka (1860–1929).

In 1881–82, he excavated the so-called "Heroon of Trysa" in Lycia, shipping more than 100 boxes of material to the Kunsthistorisches Museum in Vienna.  With Carl Humann, he organized an excavation of Ephesus (1895). In 1898 he founded the Österreichisches Archäologische Institut (Austrian Archaeological Institute at Athens), serving as its director until his death in 1907.

References 

 Dictionary of Art Historians  A Biographical Dictionary of Historic Scholars, Museum Professionals and Academic Historians of Art.
 This article contains some information based on a translation of an equivalent article at the German Wikipedia.

1838 births
1907 deaths
People from Greiz
People from the Principality of Reuss-Greiz
Austrian archaeologists
University of Bonn alumni
Academic staff of Charles University
Academic staff of the University of Vienna
Academic staff of the University of Zurich
Academic staff of the Ludwig Maximilian University of Munich
Members of the Göttingen Academy of Sciences and Humanities
Travelers in Asia Minor